Siobhan Roberts is a Canadian science journalist, biographer, and historian of mathematics.

Education 
Roberts was born in Belleville, Ontario. She earned a degree in history at Queen's University, then a graduate degree in journalism from Ryerson University in 1997.

Books 
Roberts is the author of:
King of Infinite Space: Donald Coxeter, the Man Who Saved Geometry, about Harold Scott MacDonald Coxeter (Walker & Company, 2006), winner of the Euler Book Prize of the Mathematical Association of America
Wind Wizard: Alan G. Davenport and the Art of Wind Engineering, about Alan Garnett Davenport (Princeton University Press, 2012), winner of the W. Gordon Plewes History Award of the Canadian Society for Civil Engineering
Genius At Play: The Curious Mind of John Horton Conway, about John Horton Conway (Bloomsbury, 2015)

Recognition
Roberts has won a number of Canadian National Magazine Awards, and she is the winner of the Communications Award of the Joint Policy Board for Mathematics "for her engaging biographies of eminent mathematicians and articles about mathematics".

References

External links
Home page

Year of birth missing (living people)
Living people
Toronto Metropolitan University alumni
Historians of mathematics
21st-century Canadian journalists
Canadian women journalists
Canadian women historians
21st-century Canadian historians
21st-century Canadian women writers
Queen's University at Kingston alumni
Writers from Belleville, Ontario